Robin Charles Scherbatsky Jr. is a fictional character created by Carter Bays and Craig Thomas for the CBS television series How I Met Your Mother, portrayed by Cobie Smulders.

Robin is the on and off love interest of Barney Stinson (Neil Patrick Harris) and Ted Mosby (Josh Radnor), and a close friend to Lily Aldrin (Alyson Hannigan) and Marshall Eriksen (Jason Segel).

Development
The creators of How I Met Your Mother, Carter Bays and Craig Thomas, always intended for Robin Scherbatsky not to be "The Mother" of Ted Mosby's children. Rather, Ted perceives Robin as the perfect woman, but "it’s [still] not his final love story." Bays and Thomas have said that "a pretty famous actress" turned down the role of Robin; they revealed in February 2014 that it was Jennifer Love Hewitt. They then cast Cobie Smulders, an unknown actress at the time. Bays and Thomas later said: "Thank God we did for a million reasons... when Ted’s seeing her for the first time, America’s seeing her for the first time – the intriguingness of that propelled the show going forward and kept the show alive."

Early life 

Robin Charles Scherbatsky Jr. was born on 23 July 1980 to a Canadian father, Robin Charles Scherbatsky Sr. (Ray Wise), and an English mother, Genevieve Scherbatsky (Tracey Ullman), in Vancouver, British Columbia. She has a teenage sister named Katie (Lucy Hale). She has a difficult relationship with her father, who raised her as if she were a boy. She is a fan of the Vancouver Canucks, a professional National Hockey League (NHL) ice hockey club based in Vancouver.

Robin had a minor career as a bubblegum pop singer under the stage name of Robin Sparkles, with one hit single, "Let's Go to the Mall." After an accompanying music video, and the ensuing year-long mall tour, she developed a serious aversion to shopping malls that lasted for years. Robin followed "Let's Go to the Mall" with the "artistic follow-up" "Sandcastles in the Sand", which tanked.

As Robin Sparkles, she also appeared on the Canadian educational children's show Space Teens with Alan Thicke and Jessica Glitter (Nicole Scherzinger), about two teen girls traveling through space in a curling stone–shaped spaceship who "solve mysteries using math."  The show was heavy with unintentional sexual innuendo, such as the song "Two Beavers Are Better Than One". 

Robin attempted to shift from teen pop to grunge by adopting a new stage name, "Robin Daggers," and penning a track entitled P.S. I Love You. "P.S." is a dark, angry song about her unrequited infatuation with an unnamed person, later revealed as Paul Schaffer. In an episode parodying Alanis Morissette and her single "You Oughta Know," Robin performed the song at the 84th Grey Cup, effectively ending her career in music. 

As an adult, Robin is embarrassed by her teenage stardom.

Character history 

After moving to New York City, Robin became a news anchor  and later became a host of her own early-morning talk show.

Robin lives in the Park Slope area of Brooklyn; she meets Ted Mosby, the show's main character, and they are immediately attracted to each other. They go on a date in which Ted steals a blue French horn for her, but Ted spoils his chances with her by impulsively saying he is in love with her. They agree to remain friends, but their relationship is complicated by lingering romantic feelings. Robin is reluctant to date Ted because he wants to get married and settle down, but they become a couple anyway at the end of season one. They break up at the end of season two, While it is difficult at first to remain in each other's lives, they eventually become close, trusted friends. At the end of the fifth season, she moves back in to Ted's apartment after her boyfriend Don (Benjamin Koldyke) breaks up with her and moves to Chicago.

Although she is a reporter for "fluff news pieces" at the end of news segments at the time of first meeting Ted, over the series she works her way up to be lead news anchor . She briefly takes a prominent anchoring position in Japan, only to return to New York and, with help from Barney, host her own talk show.

Robin is also an avid gun enthusiast.

When an old boyfriend humiliates her, Barney comforts her, and they have sex. This initially causes friction between her and Ted, but he ultimately accepts it. Barney and Robin have what they believe is a no-strings-attached sexual relationship for a few months, but they become an official couple after some aggressive prodding from Lily. They soon realize that they don't work as a couple, however, and break up. They remain friends, but it is implied Robin never truly lets Barney go. Despite spending most of "Challenge Accepted" plotting with Barney to find a way to prevent Ted from pursuing a meaningless relationship and rekindling her relationship with him in the process, she also pressures Barney into approaching Nora (Nazanin Boniadi), a woman he likes. However, when Barney asks Nora for a cup of coffee, Robin realizes she may still have feelings for him.

In the season 7 premiere episode "The Best Man", Lily confronts Robin about her feelings for Barney, and advises her to tell him. She is about to do so when Barney pulls her onto the dance floor at a wedding. Whatever tension there is between them is broken when Barney receives a call from Nora; Robin helps and feeds him the words that she had intended to say to him, which he uses to convince Nora to meet him again. In "The Stinson Missile Crisis", Robin assaults a woman setting out to destroy Barney's relationship with Nora and is sent to court-mandated therapy. They start dating shortly after. Their relationship is tested when Robin cheats on him with Barney, and she decides to break up with Kevin. She changes her mind when Kevin tells her how much he cares for her, and they stay together. After Kevin proposes to her, Robin thinks she is ready to settle down, but he takes back his proposal when she says that she is unable and unwilling to have children.

In the seventh season, Robin discovers that she is unable to have children. Although she had always believed she did not want to have children, she is devastated by the knowledge that she no longer has the option. She lies to the gang about why she is depressed . Ted senses that something more serious is going on, however, and he comforts her as she cries.

In the episode "Tailgate", Robin is put in charge of a New Year's Countdown show on her news station. The host, Sandy Rivers (Alexis Denisof), gets drunk live on the show and Robin is forced to replace him. Just before midnight, in the season finale, she revealed that she will be the bride at Barney's wedding.

Her romantic feelings for Barney resurface in the eighth season, when he begins dating Patrice (Ellen D. Williams), a cheerful coworker for whom she has an irrational hatred. When Barney announces that he is going to propose to Patrice, Robin is heartbroken. However, in "The Final Page", Barney reveals that his courtship with Patrice was an elaborate ruse designed to get Robin back; he then proposes. Robin accepts.

The final season of the show depicts the 56 hours before her wedding to Barney. On her wedding day, she gets cold feet when she learns that Ted went to great lengths to find a locket she had buried years before; she takes it as a "sign from the universe" that she should be with Ted. Wanting her to be happy, Ted tells her that he no longer loves her in that way. She goes through with the wedding after Barney vows to always be honest with her.

The series finale, "Last Forever", reveals that Robin and Barney divorced after three years . Robin leaves the group upon realizing that she can't bear to be around Barney, who has resumed his womanizing lifestyle, or Ted, who is now happily involved with Tracy McConnell (Cristin Milioti). She and the gang drift apart over the ensuing years, but she is there for Ted and Tracy's wedding, where she makes her peace with Barney

In "Timing is Everything", the first season finale of spinoff How I Met Your Father, which takes place in 2022, Robin gives Sophie Tompkins advice about fear.

By 2030, Robin is a very successful television news anchor and lives in New York. The last scene of the show depicts Robin looking outside her window to see Ted, who is now a widower and wants another chance with her, holding out the blue French horn from their first date. She smiles at him with tears in her eyes. The series' alternate ending implies that following Ted's wedding, Barney and Robin have since gotten back together.

Discography
 "Let's Go to the Mall" (released under the stage name Robin Sparkles)
 "Sandcastles in the Sand" (released under the stage name Robin Sparkles)
 "The Beaver Song"
 "P.S. I Love You" (released under the stage name Robin Daggers)

In other media 
The Robin Sparkles song "Let's Go to the Mall" was included on the video game Just Dance 3.

References

External links 
 
 Quotes by Robin Scherbatsky

How I Met Your Mother characters
Female characters in television
Fictional characters from British Columbia
Fictional female musicians
Fictional people with acquired American citizenship
Fictional reporters
Fictional singers
Fictional television personalities
Television characters introduced in 2005
Vancouver Canucks